Marios Kokkinoftas (born 15 March 2003) is a Cypriot footballer who plays as a center back for APOEL and the U17 Cyprus national team.

Career 
He made his professional debut for APOEL in a 1–0 loss against Karmiotissa. He has played as a centre back.

International career 
He made two appearances for the Cyprus U17 team and also captained the team

References

External links 

Living people
2003 births
Cypriot footballers
APOEL FC players
Association football defenders